Peoria and East Peoria, Illinois are separated by the Illinois River, a  long body of water that reaches up to a mile across in places along Peoria Lake. The Illinois River is one of six rivers that are included in the Lower Illinois River Basin which  extends between Ottawa, Illinois and the Mississippi River at Grafton, Illinois. Three of the six rivers in the Lower Illinois River Basin (Spoon River, Illinois River, and Mackinaw River) are in central Illinois. Of these waterways the Illinois is thought to be the only river large enough to support barge traffic.

In the Peoria area, there are six bridges that cross the Illinois River. Because of the topography of the cities, alignments of the numerous state routes that cross the Illinois River can be somewhat confusing. However, these routes are generally well marked. The Illinois River is part of a waterway system that begins in New Orleans, Louisiana and exits the Atlantic Ocean via Chicago and the Saint Lawrence Seaway.

Main articles 
 Cedar Street Bridge
 Bob Michel Bridge
 Murray Baker Bridge
 McClugage Bridge
 Shade-Lohmann Bridge

Peoria, Illinois
Buildings and structures in Peoria, Illinois
Bridges in Peoria County, Illinois 
Bridges in Tazewell County, Illinois